Sweet Strange Live Disc is the first live album by Buck-Tick, released on August 12, 1998. The songs were all recorded at the Nippon Budokan on either 8 or 9 May 1998. It reached number seventeen on the Oricon chart.

Track listing 
 "Sexy Stream Liner"
 "Heroin" (ヒロイン)
 "Chocho" (蝶蝶; Butterfly)
 "Kalavinka" (迦陵頻伽　Kalavinka)
 "Sasayaki" (囁き; Whisper)
 "Rasenchu" (螺旋 虫; Spiral Worm)
 "Tight Rope"
 "Chaos - Kirameki no Naka de" (Chaos～キラメキの中で; Chaos - In the Glitter)
 "My Fuckin' Valentine"
 "Lizard Skin no Shojo" (リザードスキンの少女; Lizard-Skinned Girl)
 "Muchi no Namida" (無知の涙; Tear for Ignorance)
 "Mienai Mono o Miyo to Suru Gokai Subete Gokai da" (見えない物を見ようとする誤解 全て誤解だ; While Misunderstanding and Trying to See the Invisible, Everything is Misunderstood)
 "Kimi Ga Shin.. Dara" (キミガシン..ダラ; When... You Die)
 "Schiz・o Gensou" (Schiz・o 幻想; Schiz・o Illusions)
 "Thanatos" (タナトス)
 "Candy" (キャンディ)

References 

1998 live albums
Buck-Tick albums